Valencia High School in Placentia, California, was established in 1933. The high school originally shared buildings with Bradford Avenue Elementary School until 1964, when Bradford Elementary closed and Valencia High School became the sole occupant of the campus property. Until 1967, when El Dorado High School was built, Valencia was Placentia's only high school. Valencia High School is located at 500 North Bradford Avenue; coordinates 33.87622,-117.86929.

Many of Valencia's buildings, including the auditorium and cafeteria, were built during the Depression by the WPA.

Today the school serves a student body of approximately 2,500 students living in southern Placentia and northeast Anaheim. It is one of four comprehensive high schools in the Placentia-Yorba Linda Unified School District (PYLUSD). Beginning in the summer of 2010, Valencia underwent a series of renovations and construction projects, including a new 17-classroom building, modernized school breezeway and administration building, and new bleachers at Bradford Stadium. A modernized "quad" was also among the list of projects, serving as a center of campus life and a common location of school activities. Funding for these improvements was provided by Measure A, which was approved by local voters in 2008.

Valencia is the International Baccalaureate (IB) magnet school in PYLUSD. The school's website claims it is one of the best IB programs in Orange County, CA. The school also hosts an advanced technology program called Val Tech, in which students must complete an internship during the summer between their junior and senior years.

The school's mascot is the Tiger, and its team colors are blue and gold.

Kraemer Middle School is almost part of the campus, with only a long skinny parking lot separating the two.

Athletics
The boys' tennis team won the 2012 and 2015 CIF Championships.
 The girls won CIF three years in a row (2006, 2007, 2008). The girls also won CIF in 2015. Also, boys' and girls' basketball dominated the Empire League in the 2008–09 season. Boys' cross country has dominated the Empire League since 1999, achieving a perfect score of 15 in 2015 for Empire League Finals, and qualifying for Division 1 State Championships during the 2016 season. The boys varsity water polo won Empire League in 2015 as well. The boys varsity swim team also won Empire League titles in 2003, 2006, 2007, 2008, 2014, and lately in 2021.

Notable alumni

Héctor Ambriz, pitcher for the Cleveland Indians.
Michael Chang, U.S. tennis player.
Beneil Dariush, professional MMA fighter currently fighting for UFC.
Chris Draft, NFL pro football player, Falcons/Giants/Panthers.
Suzanne Enoch, (Class of 1982) romance novel author.
Joe Garten, (Class of 1987), NFL and CFL pro football player.
Michele Granger, (Class of 1988), U.S. Olympic gold medal-winning softball player.
Daryl Mallett (Class of 1986), author and actor.
Kathy Olivier, women's basketball head coach, UNLV.
Linda Sánchez (Class of 1987), U.S. Congresswoman representing 39th District of California.
Julie Swail, U.S. Olympic women's water polo team captain at 2000 Sydney Olympics and triathlete at 2008 Beijing Olympics.
Chris Tidland, professional golfer

References

External links
Valencia High School Web Site
Valencia High School Athletics
Valencia High School Alumni Association
Diebolt

High schools in Orange County, California
Placentia, California
International Baccalaureate schools in California
Public high schools in California
Works Progress Administration in California
Educational institutions established in 1933
1933 establishments in California